Gattendorf is a town in the district of Neusiedl am See in the Austrian state of Burgenland.

It is also known as Raušer to its Croatian-speaking minority population.

Population

References

Cities and towns in Neusiedl am See District
Populated places on the Leitha
Croatian communities in Burgenland